David Jay "Davey" Hamilton (born June 13, 1962, in Nampa, Idaho) is a race car driver who competed in the Indy Racing League IndyCar Series and Stadium Super Trucks. He has made 56 series starts and while never winning a race, finished second three times. He placed second in series points in the 1996–1997 season and again in 1998 season.

Hamilton had been proficient in supermodified racing, as a frequent winner in various supermodified races, usually held in the northern areas of the United States.

Accident
In 2001 at the Texas Motor Speedway, Jeret Schroeder lost an engine exiting turn 2. This caused him to lose control of his car and make contact with Davey Hamilton's machine. Hamilton's car slammed into the wall, nearly getting caught in the catch fence, and beginning to spin a number of times before coming to rest against the inside retaining wall. Also involved in the crash was Sarah Fisher. Hamilton suffered such severe injuries to his legs and feet, that doctors at one time believed that amputation would be the best option for him.

After the crash, Hamilton took a retirement from driving, and underwent 23 operations to reconstruct his feet and legs. He began standing after five months of the crash, and spent a year requiring the use of a wheelchair. He did, however, desire to return to racing, and in 2005, started taking steps to return to the cockpit.

In 2010, after retiring from the 2010 Indianapolis 500 on the first lap, Hamilton referenced his 2001 crash while commenting on his early exit from the 500 by saying, "It’s the second-worst day of my racing career...and everyone knows my worst one."

Life after retirement
Hamilton became the color commentator for Indianapolis Motor Speedway Radio Network broadcasts in 2003. He later began driving the 2-seater IndyCar, which gives rides to VIPs and celebrities at IndyCar Series races.

Hamilton partnered with the new American Speed Association, partnering with ASA owner Dennis Huth, to take over control of the popular Southwest Tour for 2007, shortly after NASCAR terminated the popular AutoZone Elite division, which includes the popular Southwest series.  The Speedco Southwest Tour series uses the same cars as the former NASCAR-sanctioned series.

Hamilton also owns his own racing team, "Davey Hamilton Apex Racing." This team consists of two winged sprint drivers: his father Ken Hamilton and friend Mike Cullum. Also on the team is Davey's son DJ who races Outlaw Karts and Go Karts. Mike's daughter Jenna rounds out the team and she drives Outlaw Karts. In 2008, Hamilton became a partner in a group that purchased Terre Haute Action Track.

In 2014 he co-founded King of the Wing, a national pavement sprint car series.

Return to racing

In 2005, Hamilton started courting sponsors and perusing the paddock in an effort to return to racing. After settling several personal and business issues, he landed a ride for the 2007 Indianapolis 500, driving for Vision Racing. Qualifying 20th, Hamilton placed 9th after the race was ended early on lap 166 due to rain. For 2008, Hamilton re-signed with Vision Racing. He finished 14th in the 2008 Indianapolis 500. For the 2009 season, he drove for Dreyer & Reinbold Racing, and was the only one of the team's four drivers to qualify during the first weekend of qualifications. However he crashed out of the race on lap 79.

In 2010, Hamilton competed in the 2010 Indianapolis 500 for de Ferran Dragon Racing. He was involved in an incident with Tomas Scheckter on the first lap of the race, and was classified in 33rd, last place.

Hamilton's final season of races would be 2011. He finished 24th in the 2011 Indianapolis 500. He also raced in the Twin 275's at Texas for unfinished business. His final start would be at the tragic 2011 IZOD IndyCar World Championship at Las Vegas. Hamilton was fortunate enough to escape the major accident on lap 11 that killed Dan Wheldon, but the race was abandoned, and the results were scratched from official record. When the new chassis and engine package was introduced for the 2012 season, Hamilton was unable to secure a car for the 2012 Indianapolis 500 due to a lack of available rides.

In 2013, Hamilton joined the Stadium Super Trucks, serving as a substitute for Jimmy Vasser at Honda Indy Toronto; Hamilton started first in the event, but engine trouble forced him to finish seventh. In 2014, he made his season debut at the Firestone Grand Prix of St. Petersburg, where he placed 8th in the first race and 9th in the second race.

Personal life
Davey has a son named Davey Jay Hamilton Jr. (D.J.) who was born on March 15, 1997, in Idaho. D.J. is also a racing driver, racing in sprint cars and Stadium Super Trucks. He also has a daughter named Hailey.

Hamilton is a Christian.

Career results

American open–wheel results
(key) (Races in bold indicate pole position)

Indy Lights

CART IndyCar

IndyCar Series / Indy Racing League

 1 Races run on same day.
 2 Non-points-paying, exhibition race.
 3 The Las Vegas Indy 300 was abandoned after Dan Wheldon died from injuries sustained in a 15-car crash on lap 11.

Indianapolis 500

Stadium Super Trucks
(key) (Bold – Pole position. Italics – Fastest qualifier. * – Most laps led.)

References

External links

Davey Hamilton Racing
IndyCar Driver Page

1962 births
Living people
People from Nampa, Idaho
Racing drivers from Idaho
Indianapolis 500 drivers
IndyCar Series drivers
Stadium Super Trucks drivers
Motorsport announcers
USAC Silver Crown Series drivers
Dragon Racing drivers
De Ferran Motorsports drivers
Indy Lights drivers
A. J. Foyt Enterprises drivers
Arrow McLaren SP drivers
Vision Racing drivers
Dreyer & Reinbold Racing drivers